The 2012–13 UANL season is the 66th professional season of Mexico's top-flight football league. The season is split into two tournaments—the Torneo Apertura and the Torneo Clausura—each with identical formats and each contested by the same eighteen teams. UANL began their season on July 20, 2012 against Chiapas, UANL play their home games on Saturdays at 7:00 pm local time.

Torneo Apertura

Squad

Regular season

Apertura 2012 results

Results

Results summary

Results by round

Torneo Clausura

Regular season

Clausura 2013 results

Final phase

Results

Results summary

Results by round

CONCACAF Champions League

Group 6

Quarterfinals

Goals

Last updated: 02 Mar 2013

References

Mexican football clubs 2012–13 season